Ad.4 is the fourth studio album by Polish pop band Ich Troje, released in 2001.

Track listing
 "Intro 4" – 0:56
 "Powiedz" – 4:06 
 "Zawsze pójdę w twoją stronę" – 3:51 
 "Razem a jednak osobno" – 4:10 
 "Lecz to nie to" – 3:21
 "Dla ciebie" – 3:45
 "To tylko chwila" – 3:53 
 "Błędne wojenne rozkazy" – 3:32 
 "Po prostu" – 4:04 
 "Geranium" – 3:50
 "Pierwsza ostatnia miłość" – 3:53
 "Zawsze z tobą chciałbym być... (przez miesiąc)!" – 3:42 
 "I stało się..." – 3:11 
 "Wypijmy za to!" – 3:43

Charts and certifications

Charts

Certifications

References

Ich Troje albums
2001 albums